Kamasutra: The Tale of Revenge is an epic erotic drama film written and directed by Rupesh Paul. The film was announced at Cannes Film Festival 2012, by Paul after the premiere of his movie, Saint Dracula 3D, at the festival. Set in a historical backdrop,it is the journey of a poignant love amidst deceit and combat. Based on Vatsyayana's ancient Sanskrit literature, the movie narrates the tale of the forbidden world of sex and sensuality and how it transforms one's body,mind, and soul.

Synopsis

A young and beautiful princess is robbed of her dreams when forced to accept a Middle-aged King as her husband. Seething with hatred and revenge comes another princess who is bound to destroy the King and his Kingdom. Just like in a game of chess, one wrong move from the princess changes the course of her destiny.
As the tussle between love and betrayal continues - the question remains: Who will win this game - Love or Vengeance.

Cast

Production
Kamasutra was produced under the house of Rupesh Paul Productions Limited and presented by G J Entertainments. The story has been written by the director. The film is co-produced and designed by Sohan Roy, and Dr George John is the executive producer.

Rupesh Paul said:  Later in June 2016 he went against this and stated: "My film was mistaken as an erotica but it is a war film."

Music
Five of the songs from this film were shortlisted for nominations in the Best Original Song category for the 86th Academy Awards. These songs were:
 "Aygiri Nadani"
 "Har Har Mahadeva"
 "I Felt"
 "Of The Soil"
 "Sawariya"

Controversy
The director Rupesh Paul decided to replace Sherlyn Chopra, after Chopra uploaded a video clip of the photo shoot of the film on her YouTube channel without seeking his permission. He wanted to replace her with Eva Longoria or Mila Kunis. Chopra later apologized to him in writing, stating that she would not say or write anything about the film without the consent of the producers.

On 9 February 2014, Paul filed a lawsuit against Chopra for defamation, alleging that the actress had abused him on the social networking service Twitter. On 22 February Paul filed another complaint against Chopra, seeking anticipatory bail.

By March 2014, however, both parties dropped the lawsuits, publicly stating that they had decided to move on from the misunderstanding.

In June 2016, Chopra after being asked about the movie after a long period of silence, told the media that she was not involved with movie. She stated that it was "not her film" and wished the team well.

Marketing and release
The first look poster of Kamasutra, was unveiled at NFDC's film bazaar on 22 November 2012 which was held on the sidelines of International Film Festival of India (IFFI) 2012 in Goa. The Kamasutra – Photo Shoot Video with Sherlyn Chopra was revealed on 19 January 2013.

See also
Kama Sutra: A Tale of Love
Tales of The Kama Sutra: The Perfumed Garden
Tales of The Kama Sutra 2: Monsoon

References

External links

2010s erotic drama films
Films directed by Rupesh Paul
2010s Hindi-language films
2013 war drama films
Indian war drama films
Indian erotic drama films
Films based on the Kama Sutra
2013 films
Indian 3D films
Films set in ancient India
Indian epic films
Indian historical drama films
Unreleased Hindi-language films
2013 3D films
Indian erotic romance films
2013 drama films
2010s English-language films